In mathematics, more precisely in symplectic geometry, a hypersurface  of a symplectic manifold  is said to be of contact type if there is 1-form  such that  and  is a contact manifold, where  is the natural inclusion. The terminology was first coined by Alan Weinstein.

See also 
 Weinstein conjecture

References 

Symplectic geometry